Portia Katrenia Maultsby (born June 11, 1947) is an American ethnomusicologist and educator. She is a professor emerita at Indiana University who specializes in African-American music. She founded the university's Archives of African American Music and Culture in 1991.

Biography

Early life and education 
Maultsby was born in Orlando, Florida, to Maxie C. and Valdee Maultsby (later Maultsby-Williams), and grew up in the segregated American South. Her older brother was psychiatrist Maxie C. Maultsby, Jr. (1932–2016). She also had a twin brother, Casel Hayes Maultsby (1947–1988), a pilot.

Maultsby graduated from Jones High School in Orlando in 1964. She attended Mount St Scholastica College (now Benedictine College) in Atchison, Kansas, on a music scholarship, graduating in 1968 with a bachelor's degree in piano, theory, and composition. The following year, she earned a master's degree in musicology from the University of Wisconsin-Madison. In 1974, she was awarded a PhD in ethnomusicology from the University of Wisconsin-Madison; she was the first African American to be awarded that degree in the United States.

Career 
Maultsby began lecturing at Indiana University in 1971, while still a graduate student. She became the founding director of the Indiana University Soul Revue, a student ensemble dedicated to Black music. By 1975, she was an assistant professor in the Department of African-American Studies. She went on to become chair of the department (1985–91), then professor in the Department of Folklore and Ethnomusicology (from 1992).

Maultsby's specialization in African-American music spans genres, including funk, soul, rhythm and blues, and spirituals. She founded the university's Archives of African American Music and Culture in 1991, and served as its director from 1991 through 2013. The archives started as Maultsby's personal collection and grew to include more than 10,000 pieces of music and music-related items (including interviews, photographs, and recordings) by 2003.

Maultsby co-edited two textbooks with her Indiana University colleague Mellonee V. Burnim: African American Music: An Introduction (2006) and Issues in African American Music: Power, Gender, Race, Representation (2016). She wrote the foreword to the 2018 book Black Lives Matter and Music: Protest, Intervention, Reflection, edited by Fernando Orejuela and Stephanie Shonekan.

Maultsby has also served as a consultant for museums (including serving as a senior scholar at the Smithsonian Institution in 1985) and documentary films (including the PBS documentary series Eyes on the Prize).

Selected works

Books 

African American Music: An Introduction (co-edited with Mellonee V. Burnim), 2006. 
Issues in African American Music: Power, Gender, Race, Representation (co-edited with Mellonee V. Burnim), 2016.

Book chapters

Articles

References 

1947 births
20th-century African-American women writers
20th-century African-American writers
20th-century American non-fiction writers
20th-century American women writers
20th-century American musicologists
21st-century African-American women writers
21st-century African-American writers
21st-century American non-fiction writers
21st-century American women writers
21st-century American musicologists
Academics from Florida
African-American academics
African-American music educators
Black studies scholars
African-American women academics
American women academics
African-American women musicians
American women musicologists
Benedictine College alumni
Ethnomusicologists
Indiana University faculty
Living people
American twins
University of Wisconsin–Madison College of Engineering alumni
Writers from Orlando, Florida